Wu Fenglong (born 4 August 1977) is a Chinese speed skater. He competed in the men's 1000 metres event at the 1998 Winter Olympics.

References

1977 births
Living people
Chinese male speed skaters
Olympic speed skaters of China
Speed skaters at the 1998 Winter Olympics
Place of birth missing (living people)
Speed skaters at the 1996 Asian Winter Games
20th-century Chinese people